Military training routes are aerial corridors across the United States in which military aircraft can operate below 10,000 feet faster than the maximum safe speed of 250 knots that all other aircraft are restricted to while operating below 10,000 feet. The routes are the result of a joint venture between the Federal Aviation Administration and the Department of Defense to provide for high-speed, low-altitude military activities.

Description
Military Training Routes are divided into Instrument Routes (IR), and Visual Routes (VR). Each route is identified by either of these two letters, followed by either four digits for routes below 1,500 feet above ground level, or three digits for routes extending for at least one leg above 1,500 ft AGL. (i.e., VR-1056). The difference between the IR and VR routes is that IR routes are flown under Air Traffic Control, while VR routes are not.

Airspace above the United States from the surface to 10,000 feet above sea level is limited to 250 knots (indicated airspeed) per the FAA's Federal Aviation Regulations. This speed limit hinders most modern-day tactical aircraft training operations, since low-level strikes are conducted almost exclusively at speeds exceeding 300 knots. Military Training Routes are usually limited to 420 knots, and in no case are aircraft allowed to exceed Mach 1 within United States sovereign airspace, except in designated Military Operation Areas. While on the route military aircraft squawk a Mode C Transponder code of '4000', which informs controllers that they are 'speeding' on a route. This squawk however is only legal by military aircraft, while inside a properly scheduled route corridor. MTRs do not constitute an official airspace, and are all open to VFR or IFR civilian traffic; however only military aircraft are allowed to squawk 4000 and exceed 250 knots.

Each route is defined by a number of geographical coordinates and their respective navaid fixes. From this line the corridor is extended a specific number of miles, in the vast majority of cases this is five miles, making the corridor 10 miles wide. The Routes are individually operated through one of the local military air bases, which schedule and 'own' the route. The FAA requires these bases to 'NOTAM' out the routes at least two hours prior to use to allow for civilian traffic to de-conflict if needed.....

Deconfliction
It is important to note, that there is no official means of navigation for IR or VR routes. A VR route may be flown visually, and an IR route may be flown completely heads down (although this is rarely the case). Although ATC provides deconfliction for IR Routes, VR routes are flown completely independent of external separation. Since VFR traffic does not legally have to be squawking, this provides for a serious hazard to navigation. The FAA claims the military maximizes use of IR routes for this purpose, however the vast majority of military training flights on MTRs are on VR routes.

Sources
The Department of Defense publication AP-1/B lists all military training routes in North America.   Military training routes are depicted on FAA VFR sectional aeronautical charts as narrow gray lines with IR or VR designator prefixes.

See also
Military Operations Area

External links 
 FAA Aeronautical Chart User's Guide
DoD FLIP Military Training Routes AP/1B  https://www.daip.jcs.mil/pdf/ap1b.pdf

American military aviation
Air traffic control in the United States